Isra Girgrah (born September 16, 1971) is a Yemeni-born American professional world champion female boxer.

Family and early life
The Girgrah family is of the old gypsy roaming families of Aden who are originally of Ethiopian descent. They trace their roots to the southern Yemeni mountains. Isra, at the age of 3, moved to Canada with her family in 1974 and began boxing there in 1994 to stay in shape. A multi-sport star in high school, volleyball and soccer she proved a natural as a boxer. She says she fell in love with the sport after a year of training and took it up again after graduating from college and moving to Atlanta, United States.

Career
Girgrah, whose world boxing identification number is MD040035, is an American citizen, although the "MD" in her identification number stands for Middle East. Girgrah and Naseem Hamed are the only two world champion boxers of the Arab world, and both hail of Yemeni origin. Unlike Egypt, Morocco and several other Arab nations, Yemen does not boast a rich sporting culture, yet these two phenoms have sparked worldwide interest in the hidden athletic talents Yemen may possess.

Isra's style has been dubbed beautiful & dynamic as she dominates her opponents. Her fighting nickname is "Raging Beauty". Her record includes holding 4 World Class Belts. IBF Lightweight Champion, UBA Lightweight Champion, IWBF Jr. Lightweight Champion, WIBF Jr. Lightweight Champion

Her professional boxing debut came on February 14, 1995, in Louisiana, when she lost to future world champion Deirdre Gogarty by a knockout in three rounds. On November 2, she acquired her first victory, a six-round decision win, over Melinda Robinson, another future world champion, in Austin, Texas.

On January 19, 1996, Girgrah recorded her first knockout win, beating Amy Sherald in the first round at Philadelphia, Pennsylvania. Her wins over Robinson and Sherrald were the beginning of a six fight winning streak, which included another victory over Robinson, with a six-round unanimous decision on February 22, 1996 in Corpus Christi, Texas.

The streak came to a halt when she faced Andrea DeShong, on October 6 of the same year. She and DeShong fought to a four-round draw (tie) in Washington, D.C. After that, Girgrah knocked out Norma Mosley in the second round fifteen days later, to begin a three fight winning streak that also included wins over Bethany Payne and in a rematch against Tennile Davis.

Girgrah then faced Christy Martin on a pay per view televised match that formed part of an undercard that included the Trinidad-Waters and López-Sánchez bouts. Girgrah lost to Martin on points over eight rounds, but her name's stock rose in defeat, as most boxing magazine writers agreed that she performed well against the defending WBC women's world champion.

On April 11, 1998, she rebounded from defeat in her first world title try, by knocking out Andrea Buchanan in three rounds at Columbia, South Carolina. Next came a rematch with Bethany Payne, whom Girgrah beat by a knockout in seven rounds on November 20, at Stone Mountain, Georgia.

After one more victory, she was beaten on October 23, 1999 by Marischa Sjauw by a four-round decision. This fight marked Girgrah's Las Vegas debut.

On February 16, 2000, she faced the well known Britt Van Buskirk in Miami, being held to a draw after four rounds.

Girgrah fought Melinda Robinson for the third time on July 12 at Woodlawn, Maryland. Girgrah obtained her third consecutive win over her nemesis with a six-round unanimous decision. On September 16, she beat Susan Mullet by a unanimous six-round decision in Atlantic City, New Jersey. After one more win, Girgrah received her second world championship opportunity.

On January 12, 2001, she and Mullet were rematched, with the UBA's vacant world Lightweight championship on the line. Girgrah became the first Middle Eastern woman to be a world champion in boxing history when she knocked out Mullet in the fourth round, in a fight that was, once again, held in Atlantic City.

After a fourth win over Robinson, she met Snodene Blackeney on June 1, at Atlantic City, to unify her UBA title with the WIBF world championship. Girgrah added the WIBF's belt with a ten-round unanimous decision over Blackeney.

Girgrah won her next three bouts, but she did not expose the WIBF title in any of those fights, reason why she was stripped of the WIBF championship. She won all three of those non-title bouts, which included a February 28, 2002 ten-round decision victory over Tracy Byrd in Baltimore. After those three wins, however, she was given an opportunity to regain her WIBF championship.

Fighting for the vacant championship that she had vacated herself, Girgrah met Michele Nielsen on August 24, with Girgrah recovering the title by a ten-round decision win, once again, in Atlantic City.

She followed this win with a series of non-title bouts, which led to her being stripped again, this time of the UBA and the WIBF belts. But among the fighters she beat were Mexico's Laura Serrano, decisioned over eight rounds on April 18, 2003 in Lemoore, California, and Puerto Rico's Melissa Del Valle, outpointed over eight rounds on September 6 of that same year in Washington, D.C.

After the win against Del Valle, Girgrah fought Jo Wyman on December 13, for the IFBA's vacant world Jr. Lightweight title. Contrary to common boxing practice, Girgrah won her second division world championship by going down in weight, when she outpointed Wyman over 10 rounds in Washington.

On March 27, 2004, she had her fourth fight with Carla Witherspoon, defeating Witherspoon by a six-round unanimous decision in Washington. Girgrah also has four victories without a loss against Witherspoon. The March 27 bout has been Girgrah's last fight to date.

Records
Isra Girgrah has a record of  28 wins, 3 losses and 2 draws in 33 bouts as a professional boxer, with 11 wins by knockout. Her record includes holding 4 World Class Belts. IBF Lightweight Champion, UBA Lightweight Champion, IWBF Jr. Lightweight Champion, WIBF Jr. Lightweight Champion

Professional boxing record

References

External links
Isra (RagingBeauty) Girgrah's Fighting Record

1971 births
Living people
American people of Yemeni descent
Yemeni women boxers
People from Aden
Boxers from Atlanta
Yemeni emigrants to Canada
Yemeni emigrants to the United States
American women boxers
Featherweight boxers
21st-century American women